Laurent Cazalon (born 1 October 1979 in Mulhouse, France) is a retired French former professional basketball player.

Professional career
Cazalon was the French 2nd Division French Player's MVP in 2001.

National team career
Cazalon played in six games with the senior men's French national basketball team, in 2008.

References

1979 births
Living people
French men's basketball players
Sportspeople from Mulhouse